JFK is the original soundtrack of the 1991 Academy Award and Golden Globe Award-winning film, JFK, starring Kevin Costner, Tommy Lee Jones, Kevin Bacon, Joe Pesci and Sissy Spacek. The original score was composed and conducted by John Williams.

The album was nominated for the Academy Award for Best Original Score (lost to the score of Beauty and the Beast).

Track listing 
All tracks written by John Williams, except where noted.

References 

1990s film soundtrack albums
1992 soundtrack albums
Elektra Records soundtracks
John Williams soundtracks